Dr Howard Geoffrey Alvan Stoate (born 14 April 1954) is a British Labour Party politician who was the Member of Parliament (MP) for the Dartford constituency in Kent from 1997 to 2010.

Early life
He went to the independent Kingston Grammar School and at King's College London, gaining an MSc and Diploma of the RCOG (DRCOG). Stoate was a junior hospital doctor from 1977 to 1981, then a general practitioner in Bexleyheath from 1982, and a GP tutor at Queen Mary's Hospital in Sidcup from 1989. He was a Dartford Borough Councillor from 1990 to 99, Chair of Finance 1995–97.

Parliamentary career
Stoate was elected MP for Dartford in 1997, ousting the four-term Conservative incumbent Bob Dunn; he had previously contested the Dartford seat in 1992 and Old Bexley and Sidcup in 1987. Having won the seat, he was re-elected in 2001 and 2005. He served as Parliamentary Private Secretary to Estelle Morris between 2003 and 2005.

Stoate announced on 28 July 2009 that he would stand down at the next election.

He has also written a number of pamphlets for the Fabian Society including 'Challenging the Citadel' in 2006.

Subsequent career
On leaving Parliament he became Chair of the Bexley Clinical Commissioning Group,  having continued to practice as a GP during his parliamentary career.

Personal life
He married Deborah Dunkerley in 1979 in Dartford and they have two sons (born September 1984 and April 1987).

References

External links 
 
 Dr Howard Stoate official site
 Guardian Unlimited Politics - Ask Aristotle: Howard Stoate MP
 TheyWorkForYou.com - Howard Stoate MP
 BBC Politics page

News items
 Tanning salons in July 2006
 Having to move out of his offices in July 2005
 Warning about obesity in January 2003

1954 births
Living people
Labour Party (UK) MPs for English constituencies
UK MPs 1997–2001
UK MPs 2001–2005
UK MPs 2005–2010
20th-century English medical doctors
Alumni of King's College London
Borough of Dartford
Councillors in Kent
People educated at Kingston Grammar School
Members of the Fabian Society